The Adapazarı branch is a short,  railway branch line off the Istanbul–Ankara main line. The line was opened in 1899 by the Chemins de Fer Ottomans d'Anatolie, and runs from Arifiye to Adapazarı. An extension to Bolu and Ankara was planned but never constructed.

References

External links
http://www.trainsofturkey.com/w/pmwiki.php/History/CFOA

Railway lines in Turkey
Standard gauge railways in Turkey